is a Japanese boxer. He competed in the men's lightweight event at the 1964 Summer Olympics.

References

1942 births
Living people
Japanese male boxers
Olympic boxers of Japan
Boxers at the 1964 Summer Olympics
Place of birth missing (living people)
Asian Games medalists in boxing
Boxers at the 1962 Asian Games
Asian Games silver medalists for Japan
Medalists at the 1962 Asian Games
Lightweight boxers
20th-century Japanese people